Mundelein Elementary School District 75 is an elementary school district based entirely in the western Lake County village of Mundelein, Illinois. The district is composed of three schools: an early learning center, an intermediate grade school, and a middle school. All schools are located in the village of Mundelein. Students in the district attend Washington Elementary School, which serves kindergarteners, first graders, and second graders under Principal Stephanie Drake. Students then proceed to Mechanics Grove Elementary School, which serves grades three through five and is led by Principal Tanya Fergus. Mechanics Grove then feeds into Carl Sandburg Middle School, which serves grades six through eight under Principal Mark Pilut. The district also hosts the Lincoln Early Childhood Center, a multi-district pre-kindergarten program. The district superintendent is Dr. Kevin Myers, who is also the superintendent of Mundelein Consolidated High School District 120.

Lincoln Early Childhood Center
Lincoln Early Childhood Center was the first public school to open in the Mundelein area in 1894. Originally known as Lincoln Elementary School, it contained only two classrooms. In 1938, a Gymnasium/cafeteria was added to the school. In the 1950s, an increase in enrollment led to the addition of an entire new floor of classrooms, a library, and a main office.

In 1979, Lincoln School closed due to low enrollment. It remained closed until the 1996–1997 school year when it reopened due to increasing enrollment in the district. At that time, the school added a multi-purpose room. Lincoln School was the first school in the area and the only school in the district to run on an all year round schedule until the end of the 2005–2006 school year.

During the 2002–2003 school year, the kiln in the school's art room caught on fire. The fire damage was so bad that the entire second floor classes at Lincoln School had to be moved to other places. That year, the second floor hosted the South Family group of classes. The 2 primary classes (first and second grades combined) were moved into the Multi-Purpose Room at Lincoln for the rest of the school year. And the intermediate classes (third, fourth, and fifth grades combined) had their classes at the district office for the rest of the year. By the beginning of the 2003–2004 school year, the entire floor was remodeled with new lockers, carpet, flooring, desks, and other items.

The school hosted grade K-5 until the 2006–2007 school year. In the 2006–2007 school year, the school ended its year round schedule and Kindergarten and first grade classes moved to Washington School.

Then on February 16, 2011, school district 75 announced that it would close Lincoln School once again. The district had declining enrollment, and was facing financial difficulty due to the 2008 recession. The school closed following the 2010–2011 school year. Students and teachers in grades three, four and five moved to Mechanics Grove School. Second grade students and teachers moved to Washington School.

In 2015, Lincoln Elementary School was reopened as Lincoln Early Childhood Center, a pre-kindergarten program that is co-funded by District 75, Fremont School District 79 and Hawthorn Community Consolidated School District 73.

References

External links 
District website

School districts in Lake County, Illinois
Mundelein, Illinois
1894 establishments in Illinois
School districts established in 1894